Bagby is a surname. Notable people with the surname include:

 Andrew Bagby (1973–2001), murdered by his former partner in 2001
Anne Luther Bagby (1859–1942), American Baptist missionary from Texas. 
 Arthur P. Bagby (1795–1858), governor of Alabama
 Arthur P. Bagby Jr. (1833–1921), American lawyer, editor, and Confederate general
 Benjamin Bagby, American singer and composer
 George Bagby (author) (1906–1985), American author
 George Bagby (politician) (born 1937), American politician
 George William Bagby (1828–1883), American librarian and writer
 Hank Bagby (1922–1993), American jazz musician
 Jim Bagby Jr. (1916–1988), American baseball player
 Jim Bagby Sr. (1889–1954), American baseball player
 John C. Bagby (1819–1896), U.S. Representative from Illinois
 Larry Bagby (born 1974), American actor and musician
 R. Michael Bagby, Canadian psychologist
 Rachel Bagby (born 1956), American performance artist

See also
 Bagby (disambiguation)